Mangelia vandewouweri is a minute extinct species of sea snail, a marine gastropod mollusk in the family Mangeliidae.

Description
The length of the shell attains 9 mm.

Distribution
This extinct marine species was found in Pliocene strata in Belgium.

References

External links

vandewouweri
Gastropods described in 1960